Inner Life was an American club-oriented soul studio project formed in 1979 that enjoyed success with "I'm Caught Up (In a One Night Love Affair)" (1979), "Ain't No Mountain High Enough" (1981), and "Moment of My Life" (1982). Tracks featured the vocals of Jocelyn Brown and Leroy Burgess (formerly of Black Ivory). They were produced and arranged by Patrick Adams and engineered by Bob Blank and Joe Arlotta, the album was originally produced for executive producer Greg Carmichael, whose Red Greg Records was an early and prolific disco label based in New York. "Ain't No Mountain High Enough" is probably most well known in its classic remix by DJ Larry Levan.

Discography

Studio albums

Compilation albums
 The Anthology (Salsoul, 2005)

Singles

References

External links

American post-disco music groups
Musical groups established in 1979
American boogie musicians
Prelude Records artists
Salsoul Records artists